Jujube ( or ; also known as jube or juju) is a gummy type of candy drop.

History

A recipe for "pate de jujubes" was published in 1709.
The recipe called for gum arabic, sugar, and the date-like jujube fruit. In 1853, both "ju ju paste" and "ju ju drops" were sold by confectioners. Later, recipes used various flavorings instead of jujube fruits. Today, Jujubes are sold and kept popular by the Heide Candy Company.

See also
 Candy Raisins
 Chuckles
 Gumdrop
 Jelly bean
 Jujube fruit
 Jujyfruits
 Midget Gems (also known as Mini Gems)
 Mint (candy)
 Wine gum
 Heide Candy Company

References

External links
 Jujyfruit (Jujubes) Candy Website
 Official Ferrara Candy Website

Brand name confectionery
Candy
Farley's & Sathers Candy Company brands
Ferrara Candy Company brands
Gummi candies